The Alabama Broadcasters Association (ABA) represents radio and television broadcasters across the U.S. state of Alabama.  It is affiliated with the National Association of Broadcasters.  Every year the organization presents the ABBY (Alabama's Best in Broadcasting Yearly) Awards.  The organization also has a hall of fame.

See also
 List of radio stations in Alabama
 List of television stations in Alabama

External links

 
National Association of Broadcasters
Organizations based in Alabama